Prince Nirajan Bir Bikram Shah Dev (6 November 1978 – 1 June 2001) was a Prince of Nepal, younger brother of Prince Dipendra, who was responsible for the Nepalese royal massacre, in which Nirajan and other royals were killed at a dinner in 2001. Nirajan was next in line to the throne after Dipendra.

Education and interests

He was educated at Budhanilkantha School, Kathmandu and Eton College and had a degree of B.B.A. from Kathmandu College of Management. He was interested in sports, especially swimming.

Name Nirajan means "One without fault; perfect in all forms".

Death

Nirajan was among the victims of the  Nepalese royal massacre on 1 June 2001 along with his father, mother, sister, brother and other close royal relatives.

Honours 
National Honours
 Commemorative Silver Jubilee Medal of King Birendra (31/01/1997).

Ancestry

References

1977 births
2001 deaths
2001 murders in Asia
Deaths by firearm in Nepal
Nepalese murder victims
Nepalese princes
People educated at Eton College
People murdered in Nepal
Murdered royalty
Fratricides
Nepalese Hindus